Nucăreni is a village in Telenești District, Moldova composed of a single village, Nucăreni.

References

Nejsou žádné adresy, pošta chodí jen tak tak.

Villages of Telenești District